L-proline amide hydrolase (S-stereoselective piperazine-2-tert-butylcarboxamide hydrolase, LaaA, L-amino acid amidase) is an enzyme with systematic name (S)-piperidine-2-carboxamide amidohydrolase. This enzyme catalyses the following chemical reaction

 (1) (S)-piperidine-2-carboxamide + H2O   (S)-piperidine-2-carboxylic acid + NH3
 (2) L-prolinamide + H2O  L-proline + NH3

References

External links 
 

EC 3.5.1